The  is Japanese funicular line in Miyazu, Kyōto. This is the only funicular line  operates, while it also operates buses and ships. The line opened in 1927 as a route to Nariai-ji temple, with a scenic view of Amanohashidate. A chairlift runs along the line as well.

Basic data
Distance: 
Gauge: 
Stations: 2
Vertical interval:

See also
List of funicular railways
List of railway companies in Japan
List of railway lines in Japan

External links 
 Tankai official website

Funicular railways in Japan
Rail transport in Kyoto Prefecture
1067 mm gauge railways in Japan
1927 establishments in Japan